F-actin-capping protein subunit beta, also known as CapZβ is a protein that in humans is encoded by the CAPZB gene. CapZβ functions to cap actin filaments at barbed ends in muscle and other tissues.

Structure 

CapZβ can exist as 3 unique β subunits, dependent on alternative splicing mechanisms. CapZβ1 is 31.4 kDa and 277 amino acids in length, CapZβ2 is 30.6 kDa and 272 amino acids in length, and CapZβ3 is 301 amino acids in length (N-terminal extension of 29 amino acids relative to the β2 subunit.). In contrast, the 3 α subunits arise from distinct genes. CapZ is a heterodimer composed of an α and β subunit. In muscle, capping protein α1 subunit and β1 subunit are localized at the Z-disc, and form CapZ. CapZ interacts with α-actinin, nebulette, nebulin, HSC70. at the Z-disc.

Function 

CAPZB is a member of the F-actin capping protein family. This gene encodes the beta subunit of the barbed-end actin binding protein.  The protein regulates growth of the actin filament by capping the barbed end of growing actin filaments.

CapZβ functions to cap actin filaments at barbed (+) ends, thus controlling the rate of G-actin polymerization to F-actin and corresponding filament length. CapZ works in concert with tropomodulin, which caps actin at pointed ends. In muscle, the interaction of CapZ with actin is critical during myofibrilogenesis, as administration of a CapZ monoclonal antibody or expression of CapZ mutant protein disrupts actin filament formation and assembly of myofibrils. Isoforms of the CapZβ (β1 and β2) have distinct functions, as CapZβ1 anchors actin at Z-discs and CapZβ2 at intercalated discs. Overexpression of CapZβ2 (and concomitant down-regulation of CapZβ1) in mice resulted in a diseased phenotype with stunted growth, irregular gait, labored breathing and juvenile lethality. Ultrastructural measurements showed severely disrupted myofibrillar architecture. A function of CapZβ in transducing protein kinase C signaling in cardiac myocytes was illuminated by a study in skinned cardiac fibers which demonstrated that partial, transgenic reduction of CapZβ attenuated the functional effect of protein kinase C on contraction and disturbed normal PKC isoform translocation patterns following phenylephrine or endothelin-1 treatment. A later study showed that partial reduction of CapZβ was cardioprotective during ischemia-reperfusion injury, concomitant with altered PKC isoform translocation to myofilaments. Regarding the turnover of CapZβ, it was recently demonstrated that the protein turnover of CapZβ1 is in part regulated by the Bcl-2–associated athanogene, BAG3, through a mechanism involving the association between HSC70 and CapZβ1.

Clinical Significance
There is currently little to no data available on the relationship between the CAPZB gene and human disease.

Model organisms 

Model organisms have been used in the study of CAPZB function. A conditional knockout mouse line, called Capzbtm1a(EUCOMM)Wtsi was generated as part of the International Knockout Mouse Consortium program — a high-throughput mutagenesis project to generate and distribute animal models of disease to interested scientists.

Male and female animals underwent a standardized phenotypic screen to determine the effects of deletion. Twenty three tests were carried out on mutant mice and four significant abnormalities were observed. No homozygous mutant embryos were identified during gestation, and therefore none survived until weaning. The remaining tests were carried out on heterozygous mutant adult mice and decreased circulating triglyceride levels were observed in female animals, while males displayed abnormal behaviour in an open field.

References

Further reading

External links 
 Mass spectrometry characterization of human CAPZB at COPaKB 
 

Genes mutated in mice